Espen is a Norwegian masculine given name. In Norway it reached the peak of its popularity between 1970 and 1990, during which period approximately 1.1% of children were given that name.

Origin and variants
It originated as a variant of Asbjørn or Esben.

Given name
Notable people with the given name include:

Artists
 Espen Aalberg, Norwegian jazz musician, drummer 
 Espen Berg (musician) (born 1983), Norwegian musician, arranger and composer  
 Espen Dietrichson (born 1976), Norwegian artist
 Espen Eckbo (born 1973), Norwegian actor, writer and comedian
 Espen Sommer Eide (born 1972), Norwegian composer and musician 
 Espen Eriksen, Norwegian jazz musician founder of Espen Eriksen Trio 
 Espen Grjotheim (born 1976), Norwegian singer and actor 
 Espen Haavardsholm (born 1945), Norwegian novelist, poet, biographer and essayist 
 Espen Klouman Høiner (born 1981), Norwegian writer and actor
 Espen Beranek Holm (born 1960), Norwegian pop artist and comedian  
 Espen Lervaag (born 1977), Norwegian writer, comedian and actor 
 Espen Lind (born 1971), Norwegian record producer, songwriter, singer, and multi-instrumentalist
 Espen Rud (born 1948), Norwegian jazz musician, drummer, composer, and music arranger
 Espen Salberg (born 1952), Norwegian ballroom dancer
 Espen Sandberg (born 1971), Norwegian film director and advertising producer
 Espen Selvik, Norwegian conductor, composer, music reviewer and writer
 Espen Skjønberg (1924–2022), Norwegian stage, screen and television actor
 Espen Søbye (born 1954), Norwegian author and literary critic
 Espen Sørensen, Danish singer and musician
 Espen Stenhammer, Norwegian singer, member of Norwegian pop rock band Di Derre
 Espen Stueland (born 1970), Norwegian poet, novelist, literary critic and essayist 
 Espen Wensaas (born 1986), Norwegian musician and multi-instrumentalistm mainly mandolin, mandolin-family instruments and guitar

Sports people
 Espen Agdestein (born 1965), Norwegian chess player
 Espen Andersen (born 1961), Norwegian Nordic combined skier
 Espen Andersen (skier) (born 1993), Norwegian Nordic combined skier
 Espen Aune (born 1982), Norwegian professional strongman competitor and winner of the 2011 Norway's Strongest Man 
 Espen Baardsen (born 1977), Norwegian footballer
 Espen Harald Bjerke (born 1980), Norwegian cross-country skier 
 Espen Bjervig (born 1972), Norwegian cross-country skier
 Espen Borge (born 1961), Norwegian runner specializing in 1500 metres and 3000 metres steeplechase
 Espen Christensen (born 1985), Norwegian handball player 
 Espen Haug (footballer, born 1970), Norwegian footballer and coach
 Espen Isaksen (born 1979), Norwegian footballer
 Espen Berg-Knutsen (born 1969), Norwegian sport shooter 
 Espen Knutsen (born 1972), Norwegian ice hockey player 
 Espen Berntsen (born 1967), Norwegian football referee 
 Espen Børufsen (born 1988), Norwegian footballer 
 Espen Bredesen (born 1968), Norwegian ski jumper 
 Espen Giljane (born 1962), Norwegian ballet teacher and dancer 
 Espen Hagh (born 1974), Norwegian footballer
 Espen Hægeland (born 1981), Norwegian footballer
 Espen Lie Hansen (born 1989), Norwegian handball player
 Espen Hoff (born 1981), Norwegian footballer
 Espen Aarnes Hvammen (born 1988), Norwegian speed skater
 Espen Johnsen (born 1979), Norwegian footballer
 Espen Kofstad (born 1987), Norwegian golfer
 Espen Lie (born 1984), Norwegian chess player
 Espen Lindqvist, Norwegian bridge player  
 Espen Lysdahl (born 1990), Norwegian alpine ski racer 
 Espen Minde (born 1983), Norwegian footballer  
 Espen Nystuen (born 1981), Norwegian footballer  
 Espen Olsen (born 1979), Norwegian footballer
 Espen Bugge Pettersen (born 1980), Norwegian footballer 
 Espen Rian (born 1981), Norwegian Nordic combined skier 
 Espen Ruud (born 1984), Norwegian footballer 
 Espen Søgård (born 1979), Norwegian footballer 
 Espen Stokkeland (born 1968), Norwegian sailor and Olympic medalist
 Espen Tveit (born 1991), Norwegian speed skater

Others
 Espen Aarseth (born 1965), Norwegian media scholar and game researcher
 Espen Berg (born 1981), Norwegian humanitarian
 Espen Barth Eide (born 1964), Norwegian politician and political scientist 
 Espen Hammer (born 1966), Norwegian philosopher 
 Espen Egil Hansen (born 1965), Norwegian newspaper editor and publisher
 Espen Johnsen (politician) (born 1976), Norwegian politician
 Espen Rostrup Nakstad (born 1975), Norwegian physician

Middle name
 B. Espen Eckbo, American economist and professor
 Jon Espen Lohne (born 1964), Norwegian businessperson in the media sector
 Per Espen Stoknes (born 1967), Norwegian psychologist and politician
 Trond Espen Seim (born 1971), Norwegian actor
 Carl Espen Thorbjørnsen (born 1982), better known as simply Carl Espen, Norwegian singer and songwriter, who represented Norway in the Eurovision Song Contest 2014 
 Jarl Espen Ygranes (born 1979), Norwegian ice hockey player

Surname
Carl Espen (born 1982), Norwegian singer and songwriter
Vincent Espen (born 1986), French badminton player

See also
 European Society for Clinical Nutrition and Metabolism known also as ESPEN
 Simen & Espen, known as music producers Seeb (or SEEB / SeeB), Norwegian EDM record production duo made up of Simen Eriksrud and Espen Berg

References

Norwegian masculine given names
Masculine given names